The XXI Constitutional Government of Portugal was the 21st cabinet of the Portuguese government since the establishment of the current constitution. It was established on 26 November 2015 as a Socialist Party (PS) minority government led by Prime Minister António Costa, and ended on 26 October 2019.

Background 
After the 2015 legislative election had resulted in a hung parliament, the leader of the Portugal Ahead alliance (PPD/PSD.CDS–PP), then Prime Minister Pedro Passos Coelho  was given the task of forming a new government. However, as his minority government failed to secure support by any other party, notably the Socialist, the Government Programme was rejected by a vote of 123 to 107 deputies, leading to the government's disbandment within less than a month.

In the meantime, Socialist Party secretary-general António Costa had succeeded in securing support for a Socialist minority government by the Left Bloc (BE), the Portuguese Communist Party (PCP) and the Ecologist Party "The Greens" (PEV), in a confidence and supply agreement. Subsequently, he was appointed as the new Prime Minister on 24 November 2015. The cabinet members took their oath of office on 26 November 2015.

Composition

References 

2015 establishments in Portugal
2019 disestablishments in Portugal
Cabinets established in 2015
Cabinets disestablished in 2019
Constitutional Governments of Portugal
António Costa